From: The Scissor Girls To: The Imaginary Layer on Skeletons is the debut album by the Chicago-based no wave band, the Scissor Girls. The album was recorded in December 1993 with the intention of being released as a 10" single, but after a number of delays, including the destruction of a pressing plant to which the master tapes had been sent, the album was recut with additional tracks recorded in March 1994 and released by Quinnah Records. The CD version of the album was released on the God Is My Co-Pilot-run Making of Americans label.

Track listing
 Atomic Boys / Love Sick 
 EvrxbdxLvsaGdMxatrx 
 F*L*E*E*T*S 
 My Habit, Prescript 
 The Walking Dead 
 Parasitic 2 
 Sewers, st.s... 
 Your Lousy Scat 
 Gonioze 
 Omens

Personnel
 Azita Youssefi - vocals, bass guitar
 Heather Melowic - drums
 SueAnne Zollinger - guitar, trumpet

References

1994 debut albums
The Scissor Girls albums